A  dewlap is a longitudinal flap of skin or similar flesh that hangs beneath the lower jaw or neck of many vertebrates. More loosely, it can be various similar structures in the neck area, such as those caused by a double chin or the submandibular vocal sac of a frog. More generally, it can be any hanging mass of skin, such as a fold of loose skin on an elderly person's neck, or the wattle of a bird.  Dewlaps can be considered as a caruncle, defined as "a small, fleshy excrescence that is a normal part of an animal's anatomy".

Etymology
The word is first attested in the mid 1300s as dewelappe ("fold of skin that hangs from the throat of oxen and kine"), from lappe ("loose piece", from Old English ), but the first element *dew(e)- is of nebulous origin and meaning; it probably was altered by folk etymology with "dew". Old English had fræt-læppa in the aforementioned sense (and Middle English fresh-lappe). There also seems to be a cognate to Danish dialectal  ("flap of skin that sweeps dew from grass, especially on the neck of an ox"), but this might be a parallel independent development.

From the 1580s onward, it was applied to the fleshy fold or wattle of a turkey and also to a flaccid, elderly human throat.

Mammals

Many mammals such as dogs, rabbits and moose possess dewlaps. In zebu cattle, the dewlap is colloquially known as the "briefcase folds". The dewlap is found on female rabbits, such as the New Zealand white rabbit. While pregnant, the female rabbit will pluck fur from the dewlap to line a nest for her babies. The dewlap is also seen in both sexes of moose.

Reptiles and birds

Many reptiles have dewlaps, most notably the anole family of lizards, which have large skin dewlaps they can extend and retract. The anole family has been found to have enhanced vision for color and depth perception. This family is able to see dewlap coloration from a distance, giving the dewlap use and importance. These dewlaps are usually of a different color from the rest of their body and, when enlarged, make the lizard seem much bigger than it really is. The dewlap is primarily used when indicating territorial boundaries and for males to attract females during the mating season. The pigments generating this color are pterins and carotenoids. These two pigments are the most easily seen through the anole's eyes. Pterin and carotenoid pigments are located throughout the tissue of the dewlap, creating yellow and red hues. Lizards usually accompany dewlap movement with head bobs and other displays. The dewlap moves through extension and contraction. The muscles creating this movement are the ceratohyoid muscles and are connected to the hyoid apparatus in the throat and larynx area. Though the purpose of these displays is unclear, the colors of the dewlap and the movements during the displays are thought to be a way of standing out against visual background noise.

Many birds also have dewlaps, including domestic chickens, some cracids and some guans.

See also
 Crest
 Double chin
 Neck frill
 Wattle

References

External links
 
 Weldon Owen Pty Ltd. (1993). Encyclopedia of animals — Mammals, Birds, Reptiles, Amphibians. Reader's Digest Association, Inc. 

Vertebrate anatomy
Skin anatomy
Articles containing video clips